IJC may refer to:

 International Joint Commission, an independent binational organization established by the United States and Canada under the Boundary Waters Treaty of 1909.
 International Journal of the Commons, "an interdisciplinary peer-reviewed open-access journal"
  International Jewish Correspondence, a pen pals organization.
 Israeli Juggling Convention, the second biggest juggling convention in the world.
 Innova Junior College, a junior college in Singapore.
 Infant Jesus Convent, a secondary school for girls in the city of Melaka, Malaysia.
 Intermediate Joint Command
 Irish Junior Cup, a knockout trophy played for field hockey clubs in Ireland.
 Ivar Jacobson Consulting, a software consulting company.
 IJC, a chain manufacturer. IJC chains that have surfaced are stamped with 'ITALY' and are made of 925 sterling silver or 9 carat gold.